The Matthews Baronetcy, of Gobions in the County of Essex, was a title in the Baronetage of England.  It was created on 15 June 1662 for Philip Matthews.  The title became extinct on the death of the second Baronet in 1708.

Matthews baronets, of Gobions (1662)
Sir Philip Matthews, 1st Baronet ( – 1685)
Sir John Matthews, 2nd Baronet (died 1708)

References

Extinct baronetcies in the Baronetage of England